FMS may refer to:

Organizations

Education
 Faculty of Management Studies, one of several schools
 Farmington Municipal Schools, in New Mexico, United States
 Florida Military School, United States
 Fuchs Mizrachi School, in Beachwood, Ohio, United States

Government
 Federal Magistrates Service, now the Federal Magistrates' Court of Australia
 Federal Migration Service (Russian Federation)
 Federated Malay States, a historical British protectorate in then British Malaya
 Fiji Meteorological Service
 Financial Management Service, a bureau of the United States Treasury Department
 Foreign Military Sales, a program of the United States Department of Defense

Other organizations
 Fatima Memorial System, a healthcare complex in Lahore, Pakistan
 Finnish Missionary Society
 Fisichella Motor Sport, an Italian motor racing team
 Marist Brothers, a Catholic religious order

Science and technology

Health and medicine
 False memory syndrome
 Fibromyalgia syndrome
 Facial masculinization surgery

Technology
 Fiber Management System, hardware for managing fiber networks
 Fixed Mobile Substitution, the use of a mobile phone (cellular phone) instead of a fixed line
 Flash Media Server, a proprietary data and media server from Adobe Systems
 Fleet management software
 Fleet Management System, automotive industry software
 Flexible manufacturing system
 Flight management system, a fundamental component of a modern airliner's avionics
 Fluhrer, Mantin and Shamir attack, a cryptographic attack on the RC4 stream cipher
 FORTRAN Monitor System, a batch processing operating system
 Freenet Messaging System, part of the Freenet peer-to-peer platform
 Fuel management systems, including hardware and software
 FMSLogo, an interpreter for the logo programming language
 Pandora FMS, network monitoring software

Other uses
 "FMS" (song), by American hip hop duo New Boyz
 Final Multiple Score, used by the United States Navy
 Financial Management Standard, in Queensland, Australia

See also
 FM (disambiguation)